The Medical Academy named after S. I. Georgievsky of Vernadsky CFU (Krímskiy Gosudárstvennyy Medicínskyy Universitét ímeni S. I. Geórgievskogo) is the institution of higher medical education situated in Simferopol (Autonomous Republic of Crimea). According to some independent estimations it is one of the most prominent medical schools of Ukraine. The university has 6 faculties and 54 departments. As at 2009, 4700 students are studying here (approximately 1700 are foreign citizens from max 10-12 countries nowadays of the world). The university was decorated with Order of the Red Banner of Labour (1981) and is certified by the International Education Society as AA-level high school giving its priority under  top 1000 medical university around the world.

History 
The history of CSMU begins with the medical faculty of Tavrida University, which was founded on 10 May 1918. R. I. Gelvig was the first rector of the university and the dean of medical faculty at the same time. The first graduation of doctors had taken place in 1922; totally 523 doctors have been graduated during the faculty's existence. In 1925 the university was reorganized as a pedagogian institute and the medical faculty was liquidated.

Due to development of Crimea as a health resort, it was decided in 1930 to organize higher medical school here. The solemn opening of the Crimean Medical Institute (which consisted of one treatment-and-prophylactic faculty only) took place on 1 April 1931. The first graduation (97 students) occurred on 17 February 1936. The second faculty, that is pediatric, was organized in 1938. In 1939 the treatment-and-prophylactic faculty was renamed into the medical one.

In the time of the German invasion of the Soviet Union, the university continued working in evacuation (at first in Armavir, then in Jambul, Orjonikidze, Baku, Krasnovodsk, Kyzylorda). In sum, since June 1941 until July 1944 the institute prepared 850 doctors. In the spring of 1944 the institute returned to Simferopol.

In 1951 S. I. Georgievsky was appointed a director (subsequently a rector) of the institute (the university carries his name now). In the fifties the material base of the institute was considerably expanded. Since 1961 the institute begins preparation of medical shots for the countries of Asia, Africa and Latin America. In 1970 new rector, professor V. I. Zyablov was appointed. In 1978 a new faculty (Stomatologic) was opened. In 1979 the faculty of Postgraduating Studies was launched. In 1981 the institute was decorated with Order of the Red Banner of Labour. In the late eighties the Crimean medical institute was included into 3 top medical high schools of the ussr. In 1989 professor I. V. Bogadelnikov was elected as a new rector. Since 1992 the institute begins commercial trainings for foreign citizens, and since 1994 – for the citizens of Ukraine.

In July 1995 the Crimean Medical Institute was accredited on IV (higher) level with autonomy granted. On 8 December 1995 the institute was named in honor of S. I. Georgievskiy for his personal contribution for institute's restoration and development. Since September 1996 professor A. A. Babanin heads the institute. On 26 January 1998 the Cabinet of Ukraine decided to transform the Crimean Medical Institute into the university.

In January 2019, about 5 years after the 2014 Russian annexation of Crimea, the Cabinet of Ministers of Russia decided to merge the university with the Crimean Federal University.

Awards and reputation 
Year 1981. The institute was awarded the Order of the Red Banner of Labour.
69th place in rating of world higher medical  schools  within UNESCO project "TOP 200" 2017 year
It is also listed in webometrics and ranked 3316 under crimean federal university and alone stands among the best at rank 3512

References

External links 
 www.ma.cfuv.ru

Medical schools in Russia
Universities in Ukraine
Universities and colleges in Simferopol
1931 establishments in Ukraine
Educational institutions established in 1931
Universities and institutes established in the Soviet Union